Coralia Cartis is a Romanian mathematician at the University of Oxford whose research interests include compressed sensing, numerical analysis, and regularisation methods in mathematical optimization. At Oxford, she is a Professor in Numerical Optimization in the Mathematical Institute, and a tutorial fellow of Balliol College.

Education and career
Cartis earned a bachelor's degree in mathematics from Babeș-Bolyai University, and completed her PhD in 2005 at the University of Cambridge. Her dissertation, On Interior Point Methods for Linear Programming, was supervised by Michael J. D. Powell. In the same year, she was one of the Second Prize winners of the Leslie Fox Prize for Numerical Analysis.

After working as a researcher at the Rutherford Appleton Laboratory and a postdoctoral researcher at Oxford, she became a lecturer at the University of Edinburgh in 2007. She took her present position at Oxford in 2013.

In 2018 she became a member of the scientific board of  
the Smith Institute for Industrial Mathematics and System Engineering, and was a plenary speaker at the 16th EUROPT Workshop on Advances in Continuous Optimization in Spain.

Selected bibliography

References

External links

Year of birth missing (living people)
Living people
Romanian mathematicians
Women mathematicians
Babeș-Bolyai University alumni
Alumni of the University of Cambridge
Academics of the University of Edinburgh
Academics of the University of Oxford